Saint Anne's Community College is a Catholic secondary public school in Killaloe, County Clare in Ireland. Opened as a community school in 1987, it replaced the local all-girl secondary school, which had been founded in 1945 by the Sisters of Mercy.

References

External links
 Official website

Secondary schools in County Clare